Strike Fighter Squadron 81 (VFA-81), also known as the "Sunliners", is a United States Navy F/A-18E Super Hornet strike fighter squadron stationed at Naval Air Station Oceana. They are a part of Carrier Air Wing One, their radio callsign is Inferno, and their tail code is AB. Their mission is to conduct prompt and sustained combat operations from the sea. The squadron was originally designated VA-66 on 1 July 1955, was redesignated VF-81 the same day, redesignated VA-81 on 1 July 1959, and finally redesignated VFA-81 on 4 February 1988.

Insignia and nickname

The squadron was originally called Crusaders and their first insignia was approved by Chief of Naval Operations on December 16, 1955. The original insignia was a black cougar on a light blue background.

On 21 November 1963, the squadron was renamed the Sunliners and a new insignia was approved consisting of a black background with the international orange "Sun Dial" design.  They also adopted the motto "Anytime, Anyplace" at this time.

When the squadron was redesignated VFA, a modification to the current design was made on March 30, 1988.

History

1950s

The squadron was originally established as Attack Squadron 66 (VA-66) on 1 July 1955. On the same day, they were redesignated Fighter Squadron 81 (VF-81), an all weather fighter interceptor squadron flying the F9F-8B Cougar. Their first deployment was with CVG-17 in late 1956 aboard  in response to the Suez Crisis. In 1958 VF-81 made a deployment as part of Air Task Group 181 (ATG-181) aboard  to the Mediterranean Sea. In the next year VF-81 went to sea with ATG-182 to the North Atlantic aboard .

On 4 March 1959 VF-81 was reequipped with the A4D-2 Skyhawk and redesignated attack squadron VA-81 on 1 July 1959.

1960s

VA-81 was assigned to CVG-8 and made five deployments to the Mediterranean Sea aboard  between 1960 and 1966.

The detachment was provided air cover for antisubmarine warfare units embarked on USS Essex with their AIM-9 Sidewinder missiles. The detachment was the first jet unit to function as part of an antisubmarine killer force.

In April 1963 the squadron transitioned from the A-4B (A4D-2) to the A-4C Skyhawk.

In 1966 and 1967, VA-81 was deployed with CVG-8 to the Mediterranean, this time aboard . For the 1967/68 deployment aboard the same carrier, the squadron flew the A-4C.

In 1969 VA-81 A-4Cs made a single deployment to the Mediterranean aboard  as part of CVW-1, operating for a time off the coast of Libya following the 1969 Libyan coup d'état.

1970s
In February 1970, the squadron won the Navy Battle "E" for East Coast A-4 squadrons.  In May 1970, VA-81 transitioned to the A-7E Corsair II and was reassigned to CVW-17.

Between 1971 and 1982 VA-81 made eight deployments to the 6th Fleet aboard USS Forrestal.

In December 1972, the squadron's A-7Es conducted cross-deck operations with the British carrier .

From July to August 1974, VA-81 operated from USS Forrestal in the vicinity of Cyprus following the coup and subsequent Turkish invasion. Surveillance and cover missions were flown by the squadron during the crisis.

1980s

VA-81 embarked on USS Forrestal from May to June 1981, operating in the eastern Mediterranean following Israeli reprisal raids against Syrian missile batteries located in southern Lebanon.
In August 1981, the squadron participated a Freedom of Navigation Exercise in the Gulf of Sidra. During this exercise on August 18, two F-14A Tomcats from  shot down two Libyan SU-22 Fitters. Tensions escalated, and VA-81 flew reconnaissance missions over potentially hostile Libyan ships.

Between 1984 and 1987 VA-81 made three deployments with Saratoga.

On March 23, 1986, while operating off coast of Libya, aircraft from Saratoga,  and  crossed what Libyan leader Muammar al-Gaddafi had called the "Line of Death" and this escalated into the Action in the Gulf of Sidra (1986). The next day, three U.S. Navy warships crossed the same 32° 30' North latitude line. Two hours later, Libyan forces fired SA-5 Gammon surface-to-air missiles from the coastal town of Sirte. The missiles missed their F-14 targets and fell harmlessly into the water. Later that afternoon, U.S. aircraft turned back two Libyan MiG-25 fighter planes over the disputed Gulf of Sidra. In response an A-6E Intruder attacked a Libyan missile patrol boat operating on the "Line of Death." Later that night, VA-81 aircraft acted as the decoy group for VA-83's HARM strike against the Libyan missile radar site at Sirte. At the conclusion, three Libyan patrol boats and a radar site were destroyed by Navy aircraft.

On February 4, 1988, VA-81 transitioned to the F/A-18C Hornet and was redesignated Strike Fighter Squadron 81 (VFA-81).

1990s
The squadron made three deployments aboard USS Saratoga between 1990 and 1994.  On its first cruise operating the F/A-18, VFA-81 participated in the Gulf War. On January 17, 1991, the first night of the war, LCDR Scott Speicher was shot down and killed while flying an F/A-18C, by a Mig-25PDS piloted by Lt. Zuhair Dawood, 84th Fighter Squadron of the Iraqi Air Force, while flying a mission west of Baghdad.

On the same day, the squadron scored the Navy's only two aerial victories over enemy fighters during the campaign by downing two Iraqi MiG-21s. VFA-81 returned to its homeport of NAS Cecil Field, Florida on 27 March 1991, following the swift coalition victory. The squadron also participated in the last Mediterranean deployment of USS Saratoga, which was decommissioned in August 1994.

In 1996 VFA-81 made a cruise with CVW-17 aboard , followed by a deployment aboard  in 1998.  Following this cruise, the squadron shifted its homeport to NAS Oceana, Virginia due to the BRAC-mandated closure of NAS Cecil Field in 1999.

2000s

In 2000, 2001 and 2002 VFA-81 made three deployments aboard  to the Mediterranean Sea and the Persian Gulf. In 2004 VFA-81 made a single deployment aboard USS John F. Kennedy.

In 2007 VFA-81 was reassigned to CVW-11 in the Pacific Fleet and deployed aboard USS Nimitz to the Western Pacific and the Persian Gulf.  Its last deployment ended on June 3, 2008, and the squadron began transition training from the F/A-18C Hornet to the F/A-18E Super Hornet.

In 2011, the squadron was embarked with CVW-17 for a Western Pacific and Persian Gulf deployment aboard .

In 2012, the squadron completed a surge deployment with Carrier Air Wing 17 aboard USS Carl Vinson.

In 2014, the squadron was embarked with CVW-17 aboard USS Carl Vinson in support of Operation Inherent Resolve and returned to NAS Oceana in 2015.

In spring 2018, the squadron was embarked with CVW-1 aboard USS Harry S. Truman in support of Operation Inherent Resolve and returned to NAS Oceana in late summer 2018.

References

External links
 VFA-81's Official Webpage

See also
Naval aviation
Modern US Navy carrier air operations
List of United States Navy aircraft squadrons
List of Inactive United States Navy aircraft squadrons

Strike fighter squadrons of the United States Navy